Fort Clark can refer to the following locations in the United States, listed alphabetically by state:
Fort Clark Trading Post State Historic Site, North Dakota
Fort Clark, later Clarksville, Indiana
Fort Clark, built at 17thc. site of former Fort Crèvecoeur near Peoria, Illinois
Fort Osage (Fort Clark, Missouri), site of the Treaty of Fort Clark, ceding Osage Nation lands 
Fort Clark, North Carolina, site of the Battle of Hatteras Inlet Batteries
Fort Clark, Texas, near Brackettville, Texas